The United Nations Conference on Trade and Development (UNCTAD) is an intergovernmental organization within the United Nations Secretariat that promotes the interests of developing countries in world trade. It was established in 1964 by the United Nations General Assembly (UNGA) and reports to that body and the United Nations Economic and Social Council (ECOSOC). UNCTAD is composed of 195 member states and works with nongovernmental organizations worldwide; its permanent secretariat is in Geneva, Switzerland.

The primary objective of UNCTAD is to formulate policies relating to all aspects of development, including trade, aid, transport, finance and technology. It was created in response to concerns among developing countries that existing international institutions like GATT (now replaced by the World Trade Organization), the International Monetary Fund (IMF), and the World Bank were not properly organized to handle the particular problems of developing countries; UNCTAD would provide a forum where developing nations could discuss and address problems relating to their economic development.

One of UNCTAD's principal achievements was conceiving and implementing the Generalized System of Preferences (GSP), which promotes the export of manufactured goods from developing countries. In the 1970s and 1980s, UNCTAD was closely associated with the New International Economic Order (NIEO), a set of proposals that sought to reduce economic dependency and inequality between developing and developed countries.

UNCTAD conferences ordinarily take place every four years, with the first occurring in Geneva in 1964; fifteen subsequent meetings have taken place worldwide, with the most recent held in Bridgetown, Barbados from 3–8 October 2021 (albeit virtually, due to the COVID-19 pandemic).

UNCTAD has 400 staff members and a biannual (2010–2011) regular budget of $138 million in core expenditures and $72 million in extra-budgetary technical assistance funds. It is a member of the United Nations Development Group, a consortium of UN entities that work to promote sustainable socioeconomic development.

Membership

As of May 2018, UNCTAD has 195 member states: all UN members plus UN observer states Palestine and the Holy See. UNCTAD members are divided into four categories based on United Nations Regional Groups, with six members unassigned: Kiribati, Nauru, South Sudan, Tajikistan, Tuvalu. List A consists mostly of countries in the African and Asia-Pacific Groups of the UN. List B consists of countries of the Western European and Others Group. List C consists of countries of the Group of Latin American and Caribbean States (GRULAC). List D consists of countries of the Eastern European Group.

The lists, originally defined in 19th General Assembly resolution 1995 serve to balance geographical distribution of member states' representation on the Trade Development Board and other UNCTAD structures. The lists are similar to those of UNIDO, an UN specialized agency.

The most recent member is Palestine

The full lists are as follows:
List A (99 members): Afghanistan, Algeria, Angola, Bahrain, Bangladesh, Benin, Bhutan, Bosnia and Herzegovina, Botswana, Brunei Darussalam, Burkina Faso, Burundi, Cambodia, Cameroon, Cape Verde, Central African Republic, Chad, China, Comoros, Côte d'Ivoire, Republic of Congo, Democratic Republic of Congo, Djibouti, Egypt, Equatorial Guinea, Eritrea, Eswatini, Ethiopia, Fiji, Gabon, Gambia, Ghana, Guinea, Guinea-Bissau, India, Indonesia, Iran, Iraq, Israel, Jordan, Kenya, Kuwait, Laos, Lebanon, Lesotho, Liberia, Libya, Madagascar, Malawi, Malaysia, Maldives, Mali, Marshall Islands, Mauritania, Mauritius, Micronesia, Mongolia, Morocco, Mozambique, Myanmar, Namibia, Nepal, Niger, Nigeria, North Korea, Oman, Pakistan, Palestine, Palau, Papua New Guinea, Philippines, Qatar, Rwanda, Samoa, Sao Tome and Principe, Saudi Arabia, Senegal, Seychelles, Sierra Leone, Singapore, Solomon Islands, Somalia, South Africa, Sri Lanka, Sudan, Syria, Tanzania, Thailand, Timor-Leste, Togo, Tonga, Tunisia, Turkmenistan, Uganda, United Arab Emirates, Vanuatu, Viet Nam, Yemen, Zambia, Zimbabwe.

List B (32 members): Andorra, Australia, Austria, Belgium, Canada, Cyprus, Denmark, Finland, France, Germany, Greece, Holy See, Iceland, Ireland, Italy, Japan, Liechtenstein, Luxembourg, Malta, Monaco, Netherlands, New Zealand, Norway, Portugal, San Marino, South Korea, Spain, Sweden, Switzerland, Turkey, United Kingdom, United States.

List C (33 members): Antigua and Barbuda, Argentina, Bahamas, Barbados, Belize, Bolivia, Brazil, Chile, Colombia, Costa Rica, Cuba, Dominica, Dominican Republic, Ecuador, El Salvador, Grenada, Guatemala, Guyana, Haiti, Honduras, Jamaica, Mexico, Nicaragua, Panama, Paraguay, Peru, Saint Kitts and Nevis, Saint Lucia, Saint Vincent and the Grenadines, Suriname, Trinidad and Tobago, Uruguay, Venezuela.

List D (24 members): Albania, Armenia, Azerbaijan, Belarus, Bulgaria, Croatia, Czech Republic, Estonia, Georgia, Hungary, Kazakhstan, Kyrgyzstan, Latvia, Lithuania, Montenegro, Poland, Moldova, Romania, Russia, Serbia, Slovakia, Slovenia, Macedonia, Ukraine, Uzbekistan.

Not assigned countries (6 members): Kiribati, Nauru, South Sudan, Tajikistan, Tuvalu.

Other states that do not participate are Cook Islands, Niue, and the states with limited recognition.

Meetings
The inter-governmental work is done at five levels of meetings:
 The UNCTAD Conference – held every four years:

 The UNCTAD Trade and Development Board – the board manages the work of UNCTAD between two conferences and meets up to three times every year;
 Four UNCTAD Commissions and one Working Party – these meet more often than the board to take up policy, programme and budgetary issues;
 Expert Meetings – the commissions will convene expert meetings on selected topics to provide substantive and expert input for Commission policy discussions.

The 15th quadrennial meeting is scheduled to take place in Bridgetown, Barbados, from 25 to 30 April 2021.

Geneva, 1964 
In response to developing country (Least Developed Country, LDC) anxiety at their worsening position in world trade, the United Nations General Assembly voted for a 'one off' conference. These early discussions paved the way for new IMF facilities to provide finance for shortfalls in commodity earnings and for the Generalised Preference Schemes which increased access to Northern markets for manufactured imports from the South. At Geneva, the LDCs were successful in their proposal for the conference with its secretariat to become a permanent organ of the UN, with meetings every four years.  At the Geneva meeting, Raul Prebisch—a prominent Argentinian economist from the United Nations Economic Commission on Latin America and the Caribbean (ECLA)—became the organization's first secretary-general.

New Delhi, 1968 
The New Delhi Conference, held in February and March 1968, was a forum that allowed developing countries to reach agreement on basic principles of their development policies. The conference in New Delhi was an opportunity for schemes to be finally approved. The conference provided a major impetus in persuading the North to follow up UNCTAD I resolutions, in establishing generalised preferences. The target for private and official flows to LDCs was raised to 1% of the North's GNP, but the developed countries failed to commit themselves to achieving the target by a specific date. This has proven a continuing point of debate at UNCTAD conferences.

The conference led to the International Sugar Agreement, which seeks to stabilize world sugar prices.

Santiago, 1972 
The Santiago Conference, 15 April 1972, was the third occasion on which the developing countries have confronted the rich with the need to use trade and aid measures more effectively to improve living standards in the developing world. Discussion centred on the international monetary system and specifically on the South's proposal that a higher proportion of new special drawing rights (SDRs) should be allocated to LDCs as a form of aid (the so-called 'link'). In Santiago, substantial disagreements arose within the Group of 77 (G77) despite preconference meetings. There was disagreement over the SDR proposal and between those in the G77 who wanted fundamental changes such as a change in the voting allocations in the South's favour at the IMF and those (mainly the Latin American countries) who wanted much milder reforms. This internal dissent seriously weakened the group's negotiating position and led to a final agreed motion which recommended that the IMF should examine the link and that further research be conducted into general reforms. This avoided firm commitments to act on the 'link' or general reform, and the motion was passed by conference.

Nairobi, 1976 and Manila, 1979 
UNCTAD IV, held in Nairobi May 1976, showed relative success compared to its predecessors. An Overseas Development Institute briefing paper of April 1979 highlights one reason for success as being down to the 1973 Oil Crisis and the encouragement of LDCs to make gains through producers of other commodities. The principal result of the conference was the adoption of the Integrated Programme for Commodities. The programme covered the principal commodity exports and its objectives aside from the stabilisation of commodity prices were: "Just and remunerative pricing, taking into account world inflation", the expansion of processing, distribution and control of technology by LDCs and improved access to markets.

UNCTAD V in the wake of the Nairobi Conference, held in Manila 1979 focused on the key issues of: protectionism in developing countries and the need for structural change, trade in commodities and manufactures aid and international monetary reform, technology, shipping, and economic co-operation among developing countries. An Overseas Development Institute briefing paper written in 1979 focuses its attention on the key issues regarding the LDCs' role as the Group of 77 in the international community.

Belgrade, 1983 
The sixth UN conference on trade and development in Belgrade, 6–30 June 1983 was held against the background of earlier UNCTADs which have substantially failed to resolve many of the disagreements between the developed and developing countries and of a world economy in its worst recession since the early 1930s. The key issues of the time were finance and adjustment, commodity price stabilisation and trade.

Bridgetown, Barbados 2021 
The fifteenth session of UNCTAD was originally scheduled in 2020 but was delayed until 2021 due to COVID-19.
This is the first time that the UNCTAD is held in a small island developing state (SIDS).

Achievements 
One of UNCTAD's earliest and most notable accomplishments was the formulation and implementation of GSP, which offered special tariff concessions to exports of manufactured goods by developing countries. Accepting this argument, the developed countries formulated the GSP scheme under which manufacturers' exports and import of some agricultural goods from the developing countries enter duty-free or at reduced rates in the developed countries. Since imports of such items from other developed countries are subject to the normal rates of duties, imports of the same items from developing countries would enjoy a competitive advantage.

Reports
UNCTAD produces a number of topical reports, including:
 The Trade and Development Report
 The Trade and Environment Review
 The World Investment Report
 The Economic Development in Africa Report
 The Least Developed Countries Report
 UNCTAD Statistics
 Digital Economy Report (formerly known as the Information Economy Report)
 The Review of Maritime Transport
 The International Accounting and Reporting Issues Annual Review
 The Technology and Innovation Report

Other
UNCTAD conducts technical cooperation programmes such as ASYCUDA, DMFAS, EMPRETEC and WAIPA.

In addition, UNCTAD conducts certain technical cooperation in collaboration with the World Trade Organization through the joint International Trade Centre (ITC), a technical cooperation agency targeting operational and enterprise-oriented aspects of trade development.

UNCTAD hosts the Intergovernmental Working Group of Experts on International Standards of Accounting and Reporting (ISAR).

Partnership initiatives
UNCTAD is a founding member of the United Nations Sustainable Stock Exchanges (SSE) initiative along with the Principles for Responsible Investment, the United Nations Environment Programme Finance Initiative (UNEP-FI), and the UN Global Compact.

List of Secretaries-General and Officers-in-Charge

See also

 Foreign direct investment
 Global System of Trade Preferences among Developing Countries (GSTP)
 International trade
 List of countries by received FDI
 United Nations Guidelines for Consumer Protection
 World Development Information Day

References

Notes

Further reading
  worked with UNCTAD and offers testimony from the inside.

External links

 United Nations Conference on Trade and Development
 UNCTAD member states
 Research Guide about UNCTAD (UN Library at Geneva)
 International Trade Centre
 Global Policy Forum – UNCTAD

United Nations Development Group
United Nations General Assembly subsidiary organs
International development organizations
International trade organizations
International factor movements
United Nations conferences
Diplomatic conferences in Switzerland
21st-century diplomatic conferences (UN)
20th-century diplomatic conferences
Organizations established in 1964
United Nations organizations based in Geneva